was a province of Japan in the area of Japan that is today Tochigi Prefecture. Shimotsuke was bordered by Kōzuke, Hitachi, Mutsu and Shimōsa Provinces. Under the Engishiki classification system, Shimotsuke was ranked as one of the 13 "great countries" (大国) in terms of importance, and one of the 30 "far countries" (遠国) in terms of distance from the capital. The provincial capital is located in what is now the city of Tochigi. The Ichinomiya of the province is the Futarasan jinja located in what is now the city of Utsunomiya.

History

The area of Shimotsuke is mentioned frequently in the Nara period Rikkokushi, including the Nihon Shoki and had strong connections with the Yamato court since the Kofun period. A large Buddhist temple complex, the Shimotsuke Yakushi-ji, located in what is now the city of Tochigi, dates from the Nara period.

From the Heian period, the area was dominated by a number of samurai bands, including the Utsunomiya clan, and the Nasu clan. A branch of the Minamoto clan, the Ashikaga rose to prominence during the Kamakura period from their shōen at what is now Ashikaga, and went on to create the Ashikaga shogunate of the Muromachi period.

During the Sengoku period, Shimotsuke was contested between the later Hōjō clan, the Takeda and the Uesugi clans. After the establishment of the Tokugawa shogunate, much of the province was assigned to several feudal domains. Tokugawa Ieyasu and Tokugawa Iemitsu chose the sacred site of Nikkō to be the location of their tombs, and thus the area prospered as a site of pilgrimage through the end of the Edo period.

The Nikkō Kaidō and the Ōshū Kaidō highways passed through the province, and numerous post stations were established.

Following the Meiji Restoration, the various domains became prefectures with the abolition of the han system in 1871. These various prefectures merged to form Tochigi Prefecture in 1873.

Historical districts
 Tochigi Prefecture
 Ashikaga District (足利郡) - absorbed Yamada District on April 1, 1896; later dissolved
 Aso District (安蘇郡)- dissolved
 Haga District (芳賀郡)
 Kawachi District (河内郡)
 Nasu District (那須郡)
 Samukawa District (寒川郡) - merged into Shimotsuga District on April 1, 1889
 Shioya District (塩谷郡)
 Tsuga District (都賀郡)
 Kamitsuga District (上都賀郡) - dissolved
 Shimotsuga District (下都賀郡) - absorbed Samukawa District on April 1, 1889
 Yamada District (梁田郡) - merged into Ashikaga District on April 1, 1896

Bakumatsu period domains

Notes

References
 Nussbaum, Louis-Frédéric and Käthe Roth. (2005).  Japan encyclopedia. Cambridge: Harvard University Press. ; 
 Papinot, Edmond. (1910). Historical and Geographic Dictionary of Japan. Tokyo: Librarie Sansaisha. 
 Shimotsuke on "Edo 300 HTML"

External links 

  Murdoch's map of provinces, 1903

 
Former provinces of Japan
History of Tochigi Prefecture
1871 disestablishments in Japan
States and territories disestablished in 1871